Reconstructivism is a philosophical theory holding that societies should continually reform themselves in order to establish better governments or social networks. This ideology involves recombining or recontextualizing the ideas arrived at by the philosophy of deconstruction, in which an existing system or medium is broken into its smallest meaningful elements and in which these elements are used to build a new system or medium  free from the strictures of the original.

Some thinkers have attempted to ascribe the term Reconstructivism to the post-postmodern art movement. In an essay by Chris Sunami, ("Art Essays: Reconstructivist Art") "reconstructivist art" is described as follows:

One of the examples Sunami provides of this technique is the way some modern music incorporates deconstructed samples of older music and combines and arranges the samples in a new way as part of a new composition.

See also
The Kitsch Movement
New Sincerity
 Metamodernism
Post-postmodernism
Reconstruction (disambiguation)

References

Philosophical theories
Critical pedagogy
Critical theory